Odo I may refer to:

 Odo I, Count of Orléans (9th century)
 Odo I, Count of Troyes (9th century)
 Odo I of Beauvais (died 881), bishop
 Odo I, Margrave of the Saxon Ostmark (d. 993) 
 Odo I, Count of Blois (c. 950 – 996)
 Odo I, Duke of Burgundy (1058–1103)